Thumb Drift is a 2016 racing video game where the player has to control a car to avoid hitting obstacles or the edge of the track using their thumb. Created by Australian developer SMG Studios, it was first released for iOS with an Android release following soon after.

Gameplay 
The gameplay consists of the player drifting a car along different tracks. This is done by the player dragging their finger left or right causing the back of the car to move in that direction. There are coins on the track which the player can collect. These coins can be spent on buying new cars for the player to play the game with. If the player collides with the edge of the track or an obstacle the game is over.

Reception 

Thumb Drift received generally positive reviews. TouchArcade gave the game 4.5 stars, the only criticism being the replay feature. Gamezebo praised the game for being "simple to learn", and the many unlock-able items in the game while criticizing the game being "frustrating to learn". Apple'N'Apps called the game a "quick burst of fun that just as quickly fades" and gave the game 4.5 out of 5, praising the "fast paced action", "smooth one touch arcade controls" and "great 3D design" while criticizing the layout of the tracks being the same each time, and the lack of more specific objectives. Metacritic gave the game a score of 79 out of 100.

References 

2016 video games
Android (operating system) games
Casual games
iOS games
Mobile games
Racing video games
Single-player video games
Video games developed in Australia